Nebraska has three congressional districts due to its population, each of which elects a member to the United States House of Representatives.

Census Bureau population growth estimates indicated that Nebraska will keep its third district seat after the 2020 census. An estimate from 2014 indicates that in 2020 Nebraska will have 1.957 million inhabitants,  90,000 inhabitants more than necessary for a third district.

Unlike every other U.S. state except for Maine, Nebraska apportions its Electoral College votes according to congressional district, making each district its own separate battleground in presidential elections.

Current districts and representatives
List of members of the United States House delegation from Nebraska, district boundaries, and the district political ratings according to the CPVI. The delegation has a total of 3 members, all Republicans.

Historical and present district boundaries
Table of United States congressional district boundary maps in the State of Nebraska, presented chronologically. All redistricting events that took place in Nebraska between 1973 and 2013 are shown. District numbers are represented by the map fill colors.

Obsolete districts

Fourth district

The fourth district seat was eliminated after the 1960 census.

Fifth district

The fifth district seat was eliminated after the 1940 census.

Sixth district

The sixth district seat was eliminated after the 1930 census.

At-large district

The at-large district seat was eliminated in 1883.

See also

List of United States congressional districts

References